Whitehorse electoral district was a territorial electoral district in the Yukon Territory Canada. The electoral district was created in 1903.

Results

1903 general election

1920 general election

1922 general election

References

External links
Elections Yukon

Former Yukon territorial electoral districts